Leonardo Coccorante (1680–1750) was an Italian painter known for his capricci depicting imaginary landscapes with ruins of classical architecture.

Life
Leonardo Coccorante was born in Naples, Italy.  He studied or worked under Nicola Casissa, the Flemish landscape painter Jan Frans van Bloemen (1662–1749), Angelo Maria Costa (1670–1721), and finally with Gabriele Ricciardelli (active between 1741 and 1777).  From 1737 to 1739, he was employed decorating the royal palace of Naples.

Coccorante died in Naples in 1750.

Work
He is best known for his large highly detailed landscapes with imaginary classical architectural ruins.  He often included small figures in the foreground to emphasize the expansiveness of the ruins.  Coccorante is classified as a veduta (vista) painter. Public collections holding paintings by Coccorante include the Museo Regionale Agostino Pepoli (Trapani, Italy), Pinacoteca del Castello Sforzesco (Milan, Italy), the Louvre, the Musée départemental de l'Oise (Beauvais, France), the Museum of Grenoble ( France), the Lowe Art Museum (Coral Gables, Florida), and the Honolulu Museum of Art, .

References
 Christies, Important Old Master Paintings, the Properties of the Estate of Josephine Hartford Bryce, etc. [Cavallino, Coccorante, Droochsloot, Dusart, Fontana, Giordano, Guardi, Il Guercino, De Mura, Panini, Preti, De Ribera, Romney, Tintoretto, Etc.], New York, Christies, 1993.
 Fredericksen, Burton and Federico Zeri, Census of Pre-Nineteenth-Century Italian Paintings in North American Public Collections, Cambridge, Harvard University Press, 1972.
 Sothebys, Old Master Paintings. Dirk Dalense. Delft School. Circle Of Johannes Cornelisz. Jan Van Haensbergen. Roman School. Follower Of Lucas Cranach. Jan Van Der Bent. Leonardo Coccorante. George Lambert. Circle of Nicolas De Largilliere, New York, Sothebys, 1996.

Gallery

References

External links

1680 births
1750 deaths
17th-century Italian painters
Italian male painters
18th-century Italian painters
Italian vedutisti
Italian Baroque painters
Painters from Naples
Painters of ruins
18th-century Italian male artists